Guilty as Charged may refer to:

 Guilty as Charged (Cock Sparrer album), 1994
 Guilty as Charged (Culprit album), 1983
 "Guilty as Charged" (song), a 2008 song by Gym Class Heroes
 Guilty as Charged (film), a 1991 comedy film, directed by Sam Irvin
 ECW Guilty as Charged, a professional wrestling pay-per-view event in 1999–2001
Guilty as Charged (action film)

See also
 Guilt (disambiguation)